Arulmigu Koniamman Temple, is a historic Hindu temple located on the northern bank of the Noyyal River of Coimbatore, Tamil Nadu, India. It is dedicated to the goddess Koniamman, a form of Parvati. The temple is at the center of the  city of Coimbatore in the core of the city, Town Hall, Coimbatore, Tamil Nadu, India. Koniamman is the "Guardian Deity" of the city. This temple is one of the twin historic temples in the city, the other being Perur Pateewarar Temple.

Etymology
Koyamma, the goddess worshiped by chieftain Kovan evolved into Koniamma and the name of the city Koyampuththoor could have been derived from Kovaiamma.

History
The temple was bulit during 11th century by the descendants of chieftain "Kovan".

Architecture

Car Festival

The car festival of Koniamman Temple is conducted during the month of Panguni, which is the most prominent local festival in the city.

References

External links 

Hindu temples in Coimbatore district
Parvati temples
11th-century Hindu temples
Tourist attractions in Coimbatore
Buildings and structures in Coimbatore